Lake Shastina is a census-designated place (CDP) in Siskiyou County, California, United States. It is a residential community sited on the east side of the lake of the same name. The lake is a reservoir of the Shasta River.

References 

Census-designated places in Siskiyou County, California
Census-designated places in California